Cœur de Causse (Languedocien: Còr de Causse) is a commune in the department of Lot, southern France. The municipality was established on 1 January 2016 by merger of the former communes of Labastide-Murat, Beaumat, Fontanes-du-Causse, Saint-Sauveur-la-Vallée and Vaillac.

See also 
Communes of the Lot department

References 

Communes of Lot (department)
Populated places established in 2016
2016 establishments in France
States and territories established in 2016